Johnny Flaherty (born 1949 in Kinnitty, County Offaly) is a former Irish sportsperson. He played hurling with his local club Kinnitty and with the Offaly senior inter-county team in the 1970s and 1980s.

Playing career

Club
Flaherty played his club hurling with his local club Kinnitty and enjoyed much success. His skill at the game became apparent from as early as 1957 when he won his first juvenile hurling medal with the club.  Flaherty made his senior debut for the club at the age of seventeen, as well as playing at minor and under-21 levels. In 1966 he won a county junior title with the club before going on to win senior county titles in 1967, 1978, 1979, 1983, 1984 and 1985.

Inter-county
Flaherty first came to prominence on the inter-county scene as a member of the Offaly minor and under-21 teams. He had little success in either of these grades and he quickly joined the county senior team. Flaherty emigrated to the United States at the start of the 1970s; however, when he returned he resumed his place on the Offaly senior team. Things were on the up for the Offaly hurlers in the late 1970s; however, the big breakthrough was yet to come. All this changed in 1980 when Flaherty’s team defeated reigning All-Ireland champions Kilkenny in the Leinster final. It was the first time that Offaly had captured the provincial title and it gave Flaherty his first Leinster medal. It was a remarkable turnaround for a team that had no hurling tradition. Unfortunately Offaly's dream season came to an end at the hands of Galway in the All-Ireland semi-final. In 1981 Offaly retained their provincial crown and Flaherty added a second Leinster medal to his collection. This victory allowed Offaly to advance directly to the All-Ireland final.  Galway, the reigning champions, provided the opposition on that occasion and Flaherty had a brilliant game. After fourteen minutes he passed the sliothar to Pat Carroll who scored the first of Offaly's goals. The game hung in the balance right up until the very end when Flaherty hand-passed the sliothar into the net to secure a 2-12 to 0-15 win for Offaly. The handpassed goal was later ruled out of the game as hurling's technical standards improved. It was Flaherty's first All-Ireland title and he was later rewarded with an All-Star award. Offaly lost their provincial title to Kilkenny in 1983 and Flaherty retired from inter-county hurling shortly afterwards.

References

External links
 Profile of Johnny Flaherty from Hogan Stand

1949 births
Living people
All-Ireland Senior Hurling Championship winners
Kinnitty hurlers
Offaly inter-county hurlers